Manmohan Tudu (14 January 1922 – 2007) was an Indian politician. He was elected to the Lok Sabha, the lower house of the Parliament of India as a member of the Indian National Congress. Tudu died in 2007.

References

External links
Official biographical sketch in Parliament of India website

1922 births
2007 deaths
India MPs 1971–1977
India MPs 1980–1984
Indian National Congress politicians from Odisha
Lok Sabha members from Odisha